The Association of East Asian Research Universities (AEARU) is an East Asian organisation comprising nineteen research universities. It was established in January 1996 at the suggestion of Hong Kong University of Science and Technology. The purpose of the organisation is to promote regional exchange and cooperation among member institutions, and to open a forum where leading East Asian universities may share research results.

Member universities

Fudan University
Nanjing University
Peking University
Tsinghua University
University of Science and Technology of China

Hong Kong University of Science and Technology

Kyoto University
Osaka University 
Tohoku University
Tokyo Institute of Technology 
University of Tokyo
University of Tsukuba

Korea Advanced Institute of Science and Technology
Pohang University of Science and Technology
Seoul National University
Yonsei University

National Taiwan University
National Tsing Hua University
National Yang Ming Chiao Tung University

See also 
List of higher education associations and alliances
League of European Research Universities

Notes

References

External links
Official website

Science and technology in East Asia
College and university associations and consortia in Asia
Education in East Asia